Fort Howard Veterans Hospital is an abandoned hospital in Fort Howard, Maryland, located at the end of North Point Road. It occupies part of the grounds of Fort Howard, an early fortification protecting Baltimore harbor.

History
The Fort Howard Veterans Hospital sat on the site of Fort Howard, a site that saw military action dating back to the War of 1812 when the British landed thousands of men there as the precursor to the Battle of Baltimore.  In August 1940 the Veterans Administration (VA) acquired the title to the fort, and began moving operations there in January 1941.  When the VA took over the site, the Medical Corps building was renovated to be the nurses’ home, infirmary, and attendants’ quarters.  From 1925 to 1928 that nurses' home was the headquarters of General Douglas MacArthur.  The hospital officially opened for patient care in 1943.

Starting in 1958, the hospital was a major health services research site in the VA's early effort to increase care and efficiency in its hospital system in what became known as the Fort Howard Program.  The program was the initiation of the Health Services R&D Service (HSR&D). During the program, the HSR&D established the VA's first intensive care unit to test the value of individual monitoring.

The hospital closed in the early 2000s and the VA is leasing the site for mixed-use development for veterans.

In 2014, vandals set fire to the main hospital building, resulting in significant damage to the structure.  After this incident, the property was guarded by private security due to arsonists previously setting fire to several of the buildings.

References

Defunct hospitals in Maryland
Hospitals in Baltimore County, Maryland
Veterans Affairs medical facilities
United States Department of Veterans Affairs
Hospitals established in 1812